The broad-tailed gecko, southern leaf-tailed gecko, or Sydney leaf-tailed gecko (Phyllurus platurus) is a common gecko of the family Carphodactylidae found in the Sydney Basin. The species uses its mottled colour to camouflage against bark or rock, and if threatened can drop its large fleshy tail as a decoy. The tail is also useful for fat storage. This species of gecko is available in captivity as a pet, they are a nocturnal ambush hunter, relying on camouflage and patience to catch prey. Primary prey items include large nocturnal invertebrates such as spiders, cockroaches and beetles.

Description 
Snout to vent length of 9.5 cm. Total length up to 15 cm. Mottled brown in colour with low bumpy tubercules over the body, original tails are mottled the same colour as the body with large slightly spiny tubercules, whereas regenerated tails are chunkier mottled and smooth.

Habitat 
Common generally in the greater Sydney Basin area, north to Newcastle and south to the Illawarra. It mainly inhabits rocky areas including boulders, rock faces or small rock crevices, but can also naturally be found on trees including in areas with no immediate rocky habitat. The species can occupy a wide range of niches from temperate rainforest gullies to drier sclerophyll ridge lines. It has also adapted well to human structures and can be found in garages, fences, retaining walls and homes.

Diet 
Arthropods such as spiders, moths, beetles and cockroaches.

Reproduction 

One or two eggs per clutch, laid in a crevice. Juveniles hatch after eight to ten weeks.

Captivity 
Considered an "easy to keep" species, a license is required to keep the Southern leaf-tailed gecko as a pet in Australia, though licenses may differ from state to state.

References 

 Wilson, Steve and Swan, Gerry (2003) A Complete Guide to Reptiles of Australia Reed New Holland, Frenchs Forest, New South Wales, page 88, 
 Laube, A. and Langner, C. (2007) "Die "Geckos" Australiens" Draco 8(29): pp. 4–21; in German

Geckos of Australia
Phyllurus
Reptiles described in 1790
Taxa named by George Shaw